Fatuyeh Rural District is a rural district (dehestan) in the Central District of Bastak County, Hormozgan Province, Iran. At the 2006 census, its population was 7,486, in 1,504 families. The rural district has 17 villages.

References 

Rural Districts of Hormozgan Province
Bastak County